The 50th edition of Femina Miss India was held at Yash Raj Studios, Mumbai, on March 24, 2013. The show was telecast live on Colors (TV channel). A total of 23 contestants competed in the beauty pageant. Navneet Kaur Dhillon of Punjab was crowned Femina Miss India World 2013 by the outgoing titleholder Vanya Mishra. Sobhita Dhulipala and Zoya Afroz were crowned the 1st and 2nd Runners Up respectively.

Navneet Kaur Dhillon represented India at Miss World 2013 held in Indonesia where she placed in the Top 20 and won the Multimedia Award. Sobhita Dhulipala represented India at Miss Earth 2013 held in the Philippines where she won two awards, Miss Photogenic and Miss Eco-beauty, though she did not place.

After the Femina Miss India 2013 pageant, Vijaya Sharma and Swati Kain, both Femina Miss India 2013 contestants, were designated by Femina as India's representatives to Miss Supranational 2013 and to Miss Heritage 2013 respectively. Sharma placed in the Top 20 at Miss Supranational 2013 held in Belarus, while Kain was crowned 1st Runner Up at Miss Heritage 2013 held in Zimbabwe. In addition, Femina designated Purva Rana, who was not a contestant at Femina Miss India 2013 but who had been a contestant in the 2012 edition, as India's representative at Miss United Continent 2013 held in Ecuador where she was crowned Vice-Queen/Virrena.

Final results
Color keys

Sub Contest Awards

Judges
 Karan Johar - Producer
 Asin - Actress
 Shiamak Davar - Choreographer
 Yuvraj Singh - Cricketer
 Ritu Kumar - Choreographer
 Chitrangada Singh - Actress
 John Abraham - Actor

Contestants

Contestants note
Anukriti Gusain was runner up in Pond's Femina Miss India Delhi 2013.
Anukriti Gusain later participated in Miss Asia Pacific World 2014 and was crowned 4th Runner Up at the event.
Supriya Aiman was the finalist of Femina Miss India Kolkata 2013. She was the winner of Princess of Bihar 2013 and was also crowned as Miss Bihar 2010.  She is handpicked as Miss India International 2015 and will compete in Miss International 2015 pageant as Miss India.
Anushka Shah won the Miss Hyderabad 2011 title.
Gail Da Silva was the winner of Pond's Femina Miss India Goa 2013.
Gail Da Silva later became Femina Miss India United Continent 2014.
Panchami Rao won the Miss Hyderabad 2012 title and was a runner up at Pond's Femina Miss India Bangalore 2013.
Navneet Kaur Dhillon was the contestant of I AM She 2012 and also winner of Pond's Femina Miss India Chandigarh 2013.
Sagarika Chhetri was the winner of Pond's Femina Miss India Kolkata 2013.
Saniah Baig was the winner of Pond's Femina Miss India Pune 2013.
Sobhita Dhulipala was the winner of Pond's Femina Miss India Bangalore 2013.
Zoya Afroz was the winner of Pond's Femina Miss India Indore 2013.
Manasi Moghe won the Tiara Wild Card entry to Pond's Femina Miss India 2013.
Srishti Rana is the 2nd runner up of Femina Miss India Delhi 2013 and second runner up of Miss Diva 2013.
Srishti Rana later became Miss India Asia Pacific World 2013 and eventually became Miss Asia Pacific World 2013.
Supriya Aiman later crowned Glamanand Miss India International 2015.
Vijaya Sharma, Femina Miss India Supranational 2013 later won Elite Model Look India 2014 contest.

Returns and crossovers

Femina Miss India
2014 - Gail Nicole Da Silva (Femina Miss India United Continent 2014)
2014 - Lopamudra Raut (Top 5)
2017 - Anukriti Gusain (Femina Miss Grand India 2017) 
I Am She - Miss Universe India
2012 - Navneet Kaur Dhillon
Elite Model Look India
2014 - Vijaya Sharma (Winner)
Asian Supermodel India
2012 - Vijaya Sharma (Winner)
 
Miss Diva
2013 - Manasi Moghe (Miss Diva Universe 2013)
2013 - Srishti Rana (Miss Diva Asia Pacific World 2013)
2013 - Sukanya Bhattacharya (Top 7)
2014 - Lopamudra Raut (Top 7)
Glamanand Supermodel India
2015 - Supriya Aiman(Glamanand Miss India International 2015)
2021 - Zoya Afroz(Glamanand Miss India International 2021)
 Indian Princess
 2015 - Sukanya Bhattacharya (Miss Tourism International India 2015, Miss Photogenic)

References

Live Updates Pond's Femina Miss India 2013 Contest

2013
2013 beauty pageants in India